Spirit is the third studio album by Canadian musician Milosh, under his project Rhye. It was released May 10, 2019 under Loma Vista Recordings.

Critical reception

Track listing

Charts

References

2019 albums
Rhye albums
Loma Vista Recordings albums